Sultan bin Abdullah bin Abdulaziz Al Saud (born 5 January 1995) is a son of King Abdullah who was the sixth king of the Saudi Arabia.

Early life and activities
Sultan bin Abdullah was born on 5 January 1995 in Riyadh. His blood siblings are Sahab bint Abdullah and Saad bin Abdullah. Sultan's father ascended to the throne on 1 August 2005 upon the death of his half-brother, King Fahd.

Prince Sultan has spoken highly of his childhood, believing it was the best times he ever lived. However, he says he wishes he "soaked it up more."

Sultan bin Abdullah graduated from Kingdom School in Riyadh, and particularly followed his early studies in sciences. He studied law at King Saud University.

He has business activities. He is also an advisor for the Saudi government, a board member of the King Abdullah Foundation, and is CEO of Alfa Imtiyaz Holding Company, where he directs day to day company operations.

He has traveled extensively, and his father was the main teacher in his life. Over the course of his career, he has experienced multiple important political events, the most prominent being the peaceful transition of the authority in the Saudi Kingdom after his father died.

References

Sultan
1995 births
Sultan
King Saud University alumni
Living people
Sultan